The Department of Mathematics at DTU (MAT) is an institute at the Technical University of Denmark. It was founded to consolidate all mathematical research and teaching in one institute. All bsc.-students at DTU receive at least 20 ECTS points worth of classes from MAT during their first year.

The institute is located in building 303 S at Matematiktorvet, quadrant 3 on Lundtoftesletten in Lyngby, Denmark.

Mathematical Research
The research at Department of Mathematics covers both theoretical and applications issues and is currently centered on four main areas:
Discrete mathematics 
Dynamical systems 
Applied functional analysis 
Geometry

Significant research is also done in graph theory by Carsten Thomassen.

Research Networks
MAT participate in several research networks.

The applied functional analysis group participate in a research network with Department of Mechanical Engineering, Topology Optimization (TOPOPT). 
The goal of TOPOPT is to use topology optimization and other structural optimization methods to develop systematic tools for design of Multiphysics structures. It is sponsored by a NEDO grant and a European Young Investigator award (EURYI). 
The group is also heading a mathematical network in modelling, estimation and control of biotechnological systems sponsored by The Danish Research Council for Technology and Production.

Collaborations
MAT co-organises - along with University of Southern Denmark - an annual European Study Group with Industry (ESGI), where a weeklong workshop is centered on finding solutions to mathematical modelling problems brought forth by the industry.

Master thesis projects and PhD projects are also completed in collaboration with private companies.

External links

Homepage of Department of Mathematics, DTU
History of MAT
Topology Optimization
Mathematical Network in Modelling, Estimation and Control of Biotechnological Systems

Technical University of Denmark
University and college departments